Sächsische Schweiz-Osterzgebirge is an electoral constituency (German: Wahlkreis) represented in the Bundestag. It elects one member via first-past-the-post voting. Under the current constituency numbering system, it is designated as constituency 158. It is located in central Saxony, comprising the Sächsische Schweiz-Osterzgebirge district.

Sächsische Schweiz-Osterzgebirge was created for the 2002 federal election. Since 2021, it has been represented by Steffen Janich of the Alternative for Germany (AfD).

Geography
Sächsische Schweiz-Osterzgebirge is located in central Saxony. As of the 2021 federal election, it is coterminous with the Sächsische Schweiz-Osterzgebirge district.

History
Sächsische Schweiz-Osterzgebirge was created in 2002, then known as Sächsische Schweiz – Weißeritzkreis. It acquired its current name in the 2009 election. In the 2002 through 2009 elections, it was constituency 159 in the numbering system. Since 2013, it has been number 158.

Originally, the constituency comprised the districts of Sächsische Schweiz and Weißeritzkreis. It acquired its current borders in the 2009 election.

Members
The constituency was first represented by Klaus Brähmig of the Christian Democratic Union (CDU) from 2002 to 2017. Frauke Petry of the AfD was elected in 2017. She left the party prior to the first sitting of the Bundestag, and sat as an independent for the rest of the term. Steffen Janich won the seat for the AfD in 2021.

Election results

2021 election

2017 election

2013 election

2009 election

Notes

References

Federal electoral districts in Saxony
2002 establishments in Germany
Constituencies established in 2002
Sächsische Schweiz-Osterzgebirge